Oliver Daniels (born 19 January 1964) is a Liberian sprinter. He competed in the 100 metres at the 1984 Summer Olympics and the 1988 Summer Olympics.

References

1964 births
Living people
Athletes (track and field) at the 1984 Summer Olympics
Athletes (track and field) at the 1988 Summer Olympics
Liberian male sprinters
Olympic athletes of Liberia
Place of birth missing (living people)